Ramhet Singh Yadav Sandeep Yadav is an Indian politician from the Bharatiya Janata Party and a member of the Rajasthan Legislative Assembly representing the Kishangarh Bas Vidhan Sabha constituency of Rajasthan. A Powerful Leader of Alwar District

References 

Living people
Rajasthan MLAs 2008–2013
Bharatiya Janata Party politicians from Rajasthan
Rajasthan MLAs 2013–2018
1960 births